The 1954–55 season was the 7th season of competitive football in Israel and the 29th season under the Israeli Football Association, established in 1928, during the British Mandate.

Domestic leagues

1953–54 Liga Alef
Although league matches for the previous season ended on 13 March 1954, the confirmation of the league's final standings was delayed, as a match between Maccabi Haifa and Maccabi Petah Tikva, which was played on 26 December 1953 and ended with a 3–2 win for Haifa, was claimed to be fixed, to allow Maccabi Haifa to win. Eventually, on 10 January 1955, the IFA decided to replay the match in a neutral venue, Maccabi Haifa won the rematch 4–1 and secured their spot in the top division.
However, with the IFA already deadlocked with an ongoing dispute between Hapoel and Maccabi, Beitar declared its resignation from the IFA in protest of the IFA decision to replay the Maccabi Haifa-Maccabi Petah Tikva match. Discussions were held with the help of Judge Yosef-Michael Lamm, and an agreement between the factions was reached on 28 January 1955, confirming the results of the season and reprieving Beitar Tel Aviv and Hapoel Balfouria from relegation.

Final table

Shapira Cup
During the first half of the season, as no league matches were played, Hapoel Tel Aviv organized a league competition for the top Tel Aviv teams, Hapoel, Maccabi, Beitar and Maccabi Jaffa. The competition was played as a double round-robin tournament, with the top placed team winning the cup, named after former Hapoel Tel Aviv treasurer, Yosef Shapira.

League table

Results

1954–55 Liga Alef
League matches were delayed until 6 February 1955, and by the time the IFA had gone to summer break, 20 rounds of matches were completed, delaying the end of the league season to the next season.

League table (as of 2 July 1955)

Domestic cups

The competition started on 22 January 1955, and by the end of the season reached the quarter-finals stage. The competition was completed during the next season.

National Teams

National team
No official matches were played by the national team during the season.

International club matches

Outgoing tours

Maccabi Tel Aviv tour of Italy
In August 1954, Maccabi Tel Aviv departed for a tour of Italy, intending to play Lazio, Torino, Roma and Napoli. However, the matches against Torino and Roma were cancelled, and the team returned home after playing just two matches in Italy and one more match, en route home, against RC Paris, which was Ernst Happel's first match for RC Paris.

Petah Tikva XI tour of Cyprus
On 24 September 1954 a team of players from both Hapoel Petah Tikva and Maccabi Petah Tikva departed for a tour of Cyprus, without the consent of the IFA. The Hapoel organization sent a telegram forbidding the participation of Hapoel players in any match, and the team played as Maccabi Petah Tikva.
After returning to Israel, Maccabi Petah Tikva was banned for 6 months for its part of the tour, while Hapoel Petah Tikva received a fine of IL50.

Maccabi Israel tour of England
A Maccabi XI, composed of the best players affiliated with Maccabi clubs, took a tour of England between 21 October and 7 November 1954. Maccabi lost all four matches during the tour and was criticized heavily for arranging the tour and the pick of its opponents.

Visiting foreign teams

Beşiktaş
The visiting Turks met several composite teams, in Petah Tikva, a team from the local Hapoel and Maccabi teams, in Tel Aviv a team of the best Hapoel affiliated players and in Haifa a team from the Hapoel teams of Haifa, Kiryat Haim and Tirat HaCarmel.

Udarnik Sofia
Udarnik was invited to a return visit to Hapoel tour of Bulgaria during the previous season. The team arrived 8 October 1954 and played three matches in Israel. At the end of the tour, as the Bulgarians encountered problems with obtaining visas for a layover in Istanbul, a fourth match was arranged with mixed teams of Udarnik, Hapoel Tel Aviv and Maccabi Jaffa.

APOEL FC

Associação Atlética Portuguesa

AC Omonia

References

 
Seasons in Israeli football